White Light/Black Rain: The Destruction of Hiroshima and Nagasaki is an HBO documentary film directed and produced by Steven Okazaki. It was released on August 6, 2007, on HBO, marking the 62nd anniversary of the first atomic bombing. The film features interviews with fourteen Japanese survivors and four Americans involved in the 1945 atomic bombings of Hiroshima and Nagasaki.

Interviews

Japanese survivors 

In preparation for the film, Okazaki met with more than 500 Japanese survivors of the bombings and collected over 100 interviews before settling on the fourteen subjects featured in the film. They were, in order of appearance, including age at the time of the bombings:
Shigeko Sasamori, 13 years old. Sasamori came to the United States in 1955 to undergo reconstructive plastic surgery as part of a group of women called the Hiroshima Maidens.
Keiji Nakazawa, 6 years old. Nakazawa lost most of his family in the bombing and later recounted his story in the Barefoot Gen manga series and the follow up story, an autobiography, I Saw It.
Yasuyo Tanaka and Chiemi Oka, 9 and 10 years old. Tanaka and Oka were the only survivors among 20 children housed at a Catholic orphanage in Nagasaki.
Sakue Shimohira, 10 years old. Shimohira survived along with her sister, but lost her mother and brother to the bombing. Her sister later committed suicide.
Kyoko Imori, 11 years old. Imori and her friend were the only survivors out of 620 students attending a Hiroshima school, although her friend died a week later from radiation poisoning.
Katsuji Yoshida, 13 years old. Yoshida incurred several injuries in the blast, including the right side of his face, which was disfigured by a severe burn.
Sunao Tsuboi, 20 years old. At the time of the bombing, Tsuboi majored in science at a Hiroshima University.
Shuntaro Hida, 28 years old. Military doctor who treated Hiroshima survivors after the bombing.
Satoru Fukahori, 11 years old. Orphaned
Pan Yeon Kim, 8 years old. Prior to the bombing her family immigrated to Japan from Korea to escape starvation.
Etsuko Nagano, 16 years old. Nagano lost her brother and sister to the bombing.
Senji Yamaguchi, 14 years old. During his lengthy hospitalization Yamaguchi started a survivors' group to petition the Japanese government to provide medical care to victims of the bombings.
Sumiteru Taniguchi, 16 years old. Taniguchi was a mail carrier and incurred heavy burns during the blast.

American personnel 
Okazaki also interviewed four Americans for the film. Morris R. Jeppson, weapons test officer, and Theodore "Dutch" Van Kirk, navigator, were on board the Enola Gay during the bombing missions. Harold Agnew joined them as a scientific observer during the Hiroshima mission. Lawrence Johnston was a scientist at Los Alamos who claims to be the only person to have witnessed the Trinity test as well as the atomic bombings of Hiroshima and Nagasaki.

Recognition 
White Light/Black Rain was named by the Academy of Motion Picture Arts and Sciences as one of 15 films considered for nomination as the Best Documentary Feature for the 80th Academy Awards. It was not included among the five nominees. The film was also a nominee for the Motion Picture Producer of the Year Award at the 2008 Producers Guild Awards and the Grand Jury Prize at the 2007 Sundance Film Festival. It did win the 2008 "Exceptional Merit in Nonfiction Filmmaking" Primetime Emmy Award.

See also 
Atomic bombings of Hiroshima and Nagasaki
Atomic Bomb Casualty Commission
Hibakusha
Hiroshima Peace Memorial
Hiroshima (BBC documentary)

References

External links 
 
Official Site

2007 films
2007 in the environment
American documentary films
Films about Japanese Americans
World War II television documentaries
Documentary films about the atomic bombings of Hiroshima and Nagasaki
Television shows about the atomic bombings of Hiroshima and Nagasaki
Films directed by Steven Okazaki
Japan in non-Japanese culture
Primetime Emmy Award-winning broadcasts
2000s English-language films
2000s American films